The Sree River is a rivers in the northern part of Bangladesh, (commonly known as North Bengal). It passes through Joypurhat Sadar and Akkelpur Upazilas of Joypurhat District.

References 

Sree River
Rivers of Rajshahi Division